Alexa Halko (born June 28, 2000) is a parasport athlete from the United States competing mainly in T34 classification sprint and middle-distance events. She competed at the 2016 Summer Paralympics in Rio, where she won a bronze and two silver medals for her country, and followed this with a second bronze five years later at the Tokyo Paralympics.

Personal history
Halko was born in Midwest City, Oklahoma, USA in 2000. Presently residing in Williamsburg, Virginia she attended Jamestown High School, graduating in 2018. Halko has cerebral palsy.

Athletics career
Halko started out in parasports at the age of seven after being approached at a farmer's market by a member of the Greater Oklahoma Disabled Sports Association. She had never used a wheelchair prior but uses one to race. Classified as a T34 athlete, she entered her first senior competition in 2015, competing at a Grand Prix in Mesa, Arizona. That same year Halko was chosen to represent the United States at the 2015 IPC Athletics World Championships in Doha. She entered three events and won silver medals in two, the 100 metres and the 400 metres. In both she was beaten by Great Britain's Hannah Cockroft, the long-time dominant competitor in the women's T34 sprint events but with a time of 18.55 seconds in the 100 metres, Halko set a new North America record.

The following year she qualified for the 2016 Summer Paralympics in Rio, where at the age of 16 she was the youngest member of the American track and field team. In her first race, the 100 metres (T34) she edged out Amy Siemons of the Netherlands by one hundredth of a second to take the bronze medal. She took her second medal a few days later with a silver in the 400 metres (T34), splitting the British pairing of Cockroft (gold) and Kare Adenegan (bronze). Halko finished her first Paralympics with a second silver, finishing again behind Cockroft in the 800 metres (T34).

The following year Halko travelled to London to compete in her second World Championship, winning bronze in the 100 metres and silver in both the 400 metres and 800 metres.

References

External links 
 
 

2000 births
People from Midwest City, Oklahoma
Sportspeople from Oklahoma County, Oklahoma
American female sprinters
Living people
American disabled sportspeople
Sportswomen with disabilities
Track and field athletes with cerebral palsy
Athletes (track and field) at the 2016 Summer Paralympics
Medalists at the 2016 Summer Paralympics
Medalists at the 2020 Summer Paralympics
Paralympic silver medalists for the United States
Paralympic bronze medalists for the United States
Track and field athletes from Oklahoma
Paralympic medalists in athletics (track and field)
Paralympic track and field athletes of the United States
Athletes (track and field) at the 2020 Summer Paralympics
21st-century American women